Five athletes (two men and three women) from Croatia competed at the 1996 Summer Paralympics in Atlanta, United States.

See also
Croatia at the Paralympics
Croatia at the 1996 Summer Olympics

References 

Nations at the 1996 Summer Paralympics
1996
Summer Paralympics